KWFJ (89.7 FM, "Keep Working For Jesus") is a radio station broadcasting a religious format. Licensed to Roy, Washington, United States, the station is currently owned by Bible Broadcasting Network, Inc. and features BBN programming.

References

External links
 
 

WFJ
Mass media in Pierce County, Washington
Bible Broadcasting Network